Robert "Bob" Prenoveau is an American wheelchair curler.

At the national level, he is a 2005 and 2008 United States wheelchair curling champions curler.

Teams

References

External links 

Living people
American male curlers
American wheelchair curlers
Year of birth missing (living people)
Place of birth missing (living people)